Szczepan Lech Twardoch (born 23 December 1979 in Knurów) is a Polish writer. He has written a series of best-selling novels such as Morphine (2012), Drach (2014),The King (2016), The Kingdom (2018) and Pokora (2020).

The King has been turned into a TV series, first broadcast on the Canal+ network. He has won numerous literary prizes among them the Brücke Berlin-Preis and Le Prix du Livre Européen.

He lives in Pilchowice in Upper Silesia.

Publications

Novels 

 Sternberg, superNOWA 2007
 Epifania wikarego Trzaski, Wydawnictwo Dolnośląskie 2007
 Przemienienie, Wydawnictwo Dębogóra 2008
 Zimne wybrzeża, Wydawnictwo Dolnośląskie 2009
 Wieczny Grunwald: powieść zza końca czasów, Narodowe Centrum Kultury 2010 (Wydawnictwo Literackie 2013, 2017, 2019, 2021)
 Morfina, Wydawnictwo Literackie 2012 
 Drach, Wydawnictwo Literackie 2014
 Król, Wydawnictwo Literackie 2016
 Królestwo, Wydawnictwo Literackie 2018
 Pokora, Wydawnictwo Literackie 2020
 Chołod, Wydawnictwo Literackie 2022

Short story collections 

 Obłęd rotmistrza von Egern, Fabryka Słów 2005
 Prawem wilka, superNOWA 2008
 Tak jest dobrze, Powergraph 2011
 Ballada o pewnej panience, Wydawnictwo Literackie 2017

See also
 The King of Warsaw (TV series)

External links

References

1979 births
Living people
Polish writers
Polish publicists
People from Knurów
University of Silesia in Katowice alumni